Newark Group may refer to:

The Newark Group, Inc., now Caraustar
Newark Supergroup - a sequence of Upper Triassic and Lower Jurassic sedimentary rocks in eastern North America